This is a list of the bird species recorded in Bhutan. The avifauna of Bhutan include a total of 750 species, of which one has been introduced by humans.

This list's taxonomic treatment (designation and sequence of orders, families and species) and nomenclature (common and scientific names) follow the conventions of The Clements Checklist of Birds of the World, 2022 edition. The family accounts at the beginning of each heading reflect this taxonomy, as do the species counts found in each family account. Introduced and accidental species are included in the total counts for Bhutan.

The following tags have been used to highlight several categories. The commonly occurring native species do not fall into any of these categories.

 (A) Accidental - a species that rarely or accidentally occurs in Bhutan
 (I) Introduced - a species introduced to Bhutan as a consequence, direct or indirect, of human actions

Ducks, geese, and waterfowl
Order: AnseriformesFamily: Anatidae

Anatidae includes the ducks and most duck-like waterfowl, such as geese and swans. These birds are adapted to an aquatic existence with webbed feet, flattened bills, and feathers that are excellent at shedding water due to an oily coating.

Fulvous whistling-duck, Dendrocygna bicolor (A)
Lesser whistling-duck, Dendrocygna javanica (A)
Bar-headed goose, Anser indicus
Graylag goose, Anser anser
Greater white-fronted goose, Anser albifrons (A)
Ruddy shelduck, Tadorna ferruginea
Common shelduck, Tadorna tadorna
Mandarin duck, Aix galericulata (A)
Baikal teal, Sibirionetta formosa (A)
Garganey, Spatula querquedula
Northern shoveler, Spatula clypeata
Gadwall, Mareca strepera
Falcated duck, Mareca falcata (A)
Eurasian wigeon, Mareca penelope
Indian spot-billed duck, Anas poecilorhyncha
Eastern spot-billed duck, Anas zonorhyncha (A)
Mallard, Anas platyrhynchos
Northern pintail, Anas acuta
Green-winged teal, Anas crecca
Red-crested pochard, Netta rufina
Common pochard, Aythya ferina
Ferruginous duck, Aythya nyroca
Baer's pochard, Aythya baeri (A)
Tufted duck, Aythya fuligula
Greater scaup, Aythya marila (A)
Common goldeneye, Bucephala clangula (A)
Common merganser, Mergus merganser

Pheasants, grouse, and allies
Order: GalliformesFamily: Phasianidae

The Phasianidae are a family of terrestrial birds which consists of quails, partridges, snowcocks, francolins, spurfowls, tragopans, monals, pheasants, peafowls and jungle fowls. In general, they are plump (although they vary in size) and have broad, relatively short wings.

Hill partridge, Arborophila torqueola
Chestnut-breasted partridge, Arborophila mandellii
Rufous-throated partridge, Arborophila rufogularis
Indian peafowl, Pavo cristatus
Gray peacock-pheasant, Polyplectron bicalcaratum
Japanese quail, Coturnix japonica
Common quail, Coturnix coturnix
Tibetan snowcock, Tetraogallus tibetanus
Black francolin, Francolinus francolinus
Red junglefowl, Gallus gallus
Blood pheasant, Ithaginis cruentus
Himalayan monal, Lophophorus impejanus
Snow partridge, Lerwa lerwa
Satyr tragopan, Tragopan satyra
Blyth's tragopan, Tragopan blythii
Temminck's tragopan, Tragopan temminckii (A)
Kalij pheasant, Lophura leucomelanos
Tibetan partridge, Perdix hodgsoniae

Grebes
Order: PodicipediformesFamily: Podicipedidae

Grebes are small to medium-large freshwater diving birds. They have lobed toes and are excellent swimmers and divers. However, they have their feet placed far back on the body, making them quite ungainly on land.

Little grebe, Tachybaptus ruficollis (A)
Red-necked grebe, Podiceps grisegena (A)
Great crested grebe, Podiceps cristatus
Eared grebe, Podiceps nigricollis (A)

Pigeons and doves
Order: ColumbiformesFamily: Columbidae

Pigeons and doves are stout-bodied birds with short necks and short slender bills with a fleshy cere.

Rock pigeon, Columba livia
Hill pigeon, Columba rupestris
Snow pigeon, Columba leuconota
Speckled wood-pigeon, Columba hodgsonii
Ashy wood-pigeon, Columba pulchricollis
Oriental turtle-dove, Streptopelia orientalis
Eurasian collared-dove, Streptopelia decaocto
Red collared-dove, Streptopelia tranquebarica
Spotted dove, Streptopelia chinensis
Laughing dove, Streptopelia senegalensis
Barred cuckoo-dove, Macropygia unchall
Asian emerald dove, Chalcophaps indica
Orange-breasted green-pigeon, Treron bicincta
Ashy-headed green-pigeon, Treron phayrei
Thick-billed green-pigeon, Treron curvirostra
Yellow-footed green-pigeon, Treron phoenicoptera
Pin-tailed green-pigeon, Treron apicauda
Wedge-tailed green-pigeon, Treron sphenura
Green imperial-pigeon, Ducula aenea
Mountain imperial-pigeon, Ducula badia

Cuckoos
Order: CuculiformesFamily: Cuculidae

The family Cuculidae includes cuckoos, roadrunners and anis. These birds are of variable size with slender bodies, long tails and strong legs. The Old World cuckoos are brood parasites.

Greater coucal, Centropus sinensis
Lesser coucal, Centropus bengalensis
Green-billed malkoha, Phaenicophaeus tristis
Chestnut-winged cuckoo, Clamator coromandus
Pied cuckoo, Clamator jacobinus (A)
Asian koel, Eudynamys scolopacea
Asian emerald cuckoo, Chrysococcyx maculatus
Violet cuckoo, Chrysococcyx xanthorhynchus
Banded bay cuckoo, Cacomantis sonneratii
Plaintive cuckoo, Cacomantis merulinus
Gray-bellied cuckoo, Cacomantis passerinus
Fork-tailed drongo-cuckoo, Surniculus dicruroides
Square-tailed drongo-cuckoo, Surniculus lugubris
Large hawk-cuckoo, Hierococcyx sparverioides
Common hawk-cuckoo, Hierococcyx varius
Hodgson's hawk-cuckoo, Hierococcyx nisicolor
Lesser cuckoo, Cuculus poliocephalus
Indian cuckoo, Cuculus micropterus
Himalayan cuckoo, Cuculus saturatus
Common cuckoo, Cuculus canorus

Frogmouths
Order: CaprimulgiformesFamily: Podargidae

The frogmouths are a group of nocturnal birds related to the nightjars. They are named for their large flattened hooked bill and huge frog-like gape, which they use to take insects.

Hodgson's frogmouth, Batrachostomus hodgsoni

Nightjars and allies
Order: CaprimulgiformesFamily: Caprimulgidae

Nightjars are medium-sized nocturnal birds that usually nest on the ground. They have long wings, short legs and very short bills. Most have small feet, of little use for walking, and long pointed wings. Their soft plumage is camouflaged to resemble bark or leaves.

Gray nightjar, Caprimulgus indicus
Large-tailed nightjar, Caprimulgus macrurus
Savanna nightjar, Caprimulgus affinis

Swifts
Order: CaprimulgiformesFamily: Apodidae

Swifts are small birds which spend the majority of their lives flying. These birds have very short legs and never settle voluntarily on the ground, perching instead only on vertical surfaces. Many swifts have long swept-back wings which resemble a crescent or boomerang.

White-rumped needletail, Zoonavena sylvatica (A)
White-throated needletail, Hirundapus caudacutus
Himalayan swiftlet, Aerodramus brevirostris
Alpine swift, Apus melba
Common swift, Apus apus (A)
Plain swift, Apus unicolor (A)
Pacific swift, Apus pacificus
Salim Ali's swift, Apus salimalii (A)
Blyth's swift, Apus leuconyx
Dark-rumped swift, Apus acuticauda
Little swift, Apus affinis (A)
House swift, Apus nipalensis
Asian palm-swift, Cypsiurus balasiensis

Treeswifts
Order: CaprimulgiformesFamily: Hemiprocnidae

The treeswifts, also called crested swifts, are closely related to the true swifts. They differ from the other swifts in that they have crests, long forked tails and softer plumage.

Crested treeswift, Hemiprocne coronata

Rails, gallinules, and coots
Order: GruiformesFamily: Rallidae

Rallidae is a large family of small to medium-sized birds which includes the rails, crakes, coots and gallinules. Typically they inhabit dense vegetation in damp environments near lakes, swamps or rivers. In general they are shy and secretive birds, making them difficult to observe. Most species have strong legs and long toes which are well adapted to soft uneven surfaces. They tend to have short, rounded wings and to be weak fliers.

Slaty-breasted rail, Lewinia striata
Eurasian moorhen, Gallinula chloropus (A)
Eurasian coot, Fulica atra
Gray-headed swamphen, Porphyrio poliocephalus (A)
Watercock, Gallicrex cinerea (A)
White-breasted waterhen, Amaurornis phoenicurus
Slaty-legged crake, Rallina eurizonoides (A)
Ruddy-breasted crake, Zapornia fusca
Black-tailed crake, Zapornia bicolor

Cranes

Order: GruiformesFamily: Gruidae

Cranes are large, long-legged and long-necked birds. Unlike the similar-looking but unrelated herons, cranes fly with necks outstretched, not pulled back. Most have elaborate and noisy courting displays or "dances".

Demoiselle crane, Anthropoides virgo (A)
Common crane, Grus grus (A)
Hooded crane, Grus monacha (A)
Black-necked crane, Grus nigricollis

Thick-knees
Order: CharadriiformesFamily: Burhinidae

The thick-knees are a group of largely tropical waders in the family Burhinidae. They are found worldwide within the tropical zone, with some species also breeding in temperate Europe and Australia. They are medium to large waders with strong black or yellow-black bills, large yellow eyes and cryptic plumage. Despite being classed as waders, most species have a preference for arid or semi-arid habitats.

Indian thick-knee, Burhinus indicus
Great thick-knee, Burhinus recurvirostris (A)

Stilts and avocets
Order: CharadriiformesFamily: Recurvirostridae

Recurvirostridae is a family of large wading birds, which includes the avocets and stilts. The avocets have long legs and long up-curved bills. The stilts have extremely long legs and long, thin, straight bills.

Black-winged stilt, Himantopus himantopus
Pied avocet, Recurvirostra avosetta

Ibisbill
Order: CharadriiformesFamily: Ibidorhynchidae

The ibisbill is related to the waders, but is sufficiently distinctive to be a family unto itself. The adult is grey with a white belly, red legs, a long down curved bill, and a black face and breast band.

Ibisbill, Ibidorhyncha struthersii

Plovers and lapwings
Order: CharadriiformesFamily: Charadriidae

The family Charadriidae includes the plovers, dotterels and lapwings. They are small to medium-sized birds with compact bodies, short, thick necks and long, usually pointed, wings. They are found in open country worldwide, mostly in habitats near water.

Pacific golden-plover, Pluvialis fulva (A)
Northern lapwing, Vanellus vanellus
River lapwing, Vanellus duvaucelii
Yellow-wattled lapwing, Vanellus malabaricus (A)
Gray-headed lapwing, Vanellus cinereus (A)
Red-wattled lapwing, Vanellus indicus
Lesser sand-plover, Charadrius mongolus (A)
Kentish plover, Charadrius alexandrinus (A)
Long-billed plover, Charadrius placidus
Little ringed plover, Charadrius dubius

Painted-snipes
Order: CharadriiformesFamily: Rostratulidae

Painted-snipes are short-legged, long-billed birds similar in shape to the true snipes, but more brightly colored.

Greater painted-snipe, Rostratula benghalensis (A)

Jacanas
Order: CharadriiformesFamily: Jacanidae

The jacanas are a group of tropical waders in the family Jacanidae. They are found throughout the tropics. They are identifiable by their huge feet and claws which enable them to walk on floating vegetation in the shallow lakes that are their preferred habitat.

Pheasant-tailed jacana, Hydrophasianus chirurgus (A)
Bronze-winged jacana, Metopidius indicus (A)

Sandpipers and allies
Order: CharadriiformesFamily: Scolopacidae

Scolopacidae is a large diverse family of small to medium-sized shorebirds including the sandpipers, curlews, godwits, shanks, tattlers, woodcocks, snipes, dowitchers and phalaropes. The majority of these species eat small invertebrates picked out of the mud or soil. Variation in length of legs and bills enables multiple species to feed in the same habitat, particularly on the coast, without direct competition for food. 

Whimbrel, Numenius phaeopus
Eurasian curlew, Numenius arquata (A)
Ruff, Calidris pugnax (A)
Sharp-tailed sandpiper, Calidris acuminata (A)
Curlew sandpiper, Calidris ferruginea (A)
Temminck's stint, Calidris temminckii
Little stint, Calidris minuta (A)
Jack snipe, Lymnocryptes minimus (A)
Eurasian woodcock, Scolopax rusticola
Solitary snipe, Gallinago solitaria
Wood snipe, Gallinago nemoricola
Common snipe, Gallinago gallinago
Pin-tailed snipe, Gallinago stenura
Red-necked phalarope, Phalaropus lobatus (A)
Common sandpiper, Actitis hypoleucos
Green sandpiper, Tringa ochropus
Spotted redshank, Tringa erythropus (A)
Common greenshank, Tringa nebularia
Wood sandpiper, Tringa glareola (A)
Common redshank, Tringa totanus

Buttonquail
Order: CharadriiformesFamily: Turnicidae

The buttonquail are small, drab, running birds which resemble the true quails. The female is the brighter of the sexes and initiates courtship. The male incubates the eggs and tends the young.

Yellow-legged buttonquail, Turnix tanki
Barred buttonquail, Turnix suscitator

Pratincoles and coursers
Order: CharadriiformesFamily: Glareolidae

Glareolidae is a family of wading birds comprising the pratincoles, which have short legs, long pointed wings and long forked tails, and the coursers, which have long legs, short wings and long, pointed bills which curve downwards.

Oriental pratincole, Glareola maldivarum (A)
Small pratincole, Glareola lactea

Gulls, terns, and skimmers
Order: CharadriiformesFamily: Laridae

Laridae is a family of medium to large seabirds, the gulls, terns, and skimmers. Gulls are typically grey or white, often with black markings on the head or wings. They have stout, longish bills and webbed feet. Terns are a group of generally medium to large seabirds typically with grey or white plumage, often with black markings on the head. Most terns hunt fish by diving but some pick insects off the surface of fresh water. Terns are generally long-lived birds, with several species known to live in excess of 30 years.

Slender-billed gull, Chroicocephalus genei (A)
Black-headed gull, Chroicocephalus ridibundus (A)
Brown-headed gull, Chroicocephalus brunnicephalus
Pallas's gull, Ichthyaetus ichthyaetus
Common gull, Larus canus (A)
Lesser black-backed gull, Larus fuscus (A)
Little tern, Sternula albifrons (A)
Whiskered tern, Chlidonias hybrida (A)
Common tern, Sterna hirundo (A)
River tern, Sterna aurantia (A)

Storks
Order: CiconiiformesFamily: Ciconiidae

Storks are large, long-legged, long-necked, wading birds with long, stout bills. Storks are mute, but bill-clattering is an important mode of communication at the nest. Their nests can be large and may be reused for many years.

Asian openbill, Anastomus oscitans (A)
Black stork, Ciconia nigra
Asian woolly-necked stork, Ciconia episcopus
Lesser adjutant, Leptoptilos javanicus (A)
Greater adjutant, Leptoptilos dubius (A)

Cormorants and shags
Order: SuliformesFamily: Phalacrocoracidae

Phalacrocoracidae is a family of medium to large coastal, fish-eating seabirds that includes cormorants and shags. Plumage colouration varies, with the majority having mainly dark plumage, some species being black-and-white and a few being colourful.

Little cormorant, Microcarbo niger
Great cormorant, Phalacrocorax carbo
Indian cormorant, Phalacrocorax fuscicollis (A)

Herons, egrets, and bitterns
Order: PelecaniformesFamily: Ardeidae

The family Ardeidae contains the bitterns, herons, and egrets. Herons and egrets are medium to large wading birds with long necks and legs. Bitterns tend to be shorter necked and more wary. Members of Ardeidae fly with their necks retracted, unlike other long-necked birds such as storks, ibises and spoonbills.

Cinnamon bittern, Ixobrychus cinnamomeus (A)
Gray heron, Ardea cinerea
White-bellied heron, Ardea insignis
Great egret, Ardea alba
Intermediate egret, Ardea intermedia
Little egret, Egretta garzetta
Cattle egret, Bubulcus ibis
Indian pond-heron, Ardeola grayii
Chinese pond-heron, Ardeola bacchus (A)
Striated heron, Butorides striata
Black-crowned night-heron, Nycticorax nycticorax
Malayan night-heron, Gorsachius melanolophus (A)

Ibises and spoonbills
Order: PelecaniformesFamily: Threskiornithidae

Threskiornithidae is a family of large terrestrial and wading birds which includes the ibises and spoonbills. They have long, broad wings with 11 primary and about 20 secondary feathers. They are strong fliers and despite their size and weight, very capable soarers.

Red-naped ibis, Pseudibis papillosa (A)

Osprey
Order: AccipitriformesFamily: Pandionidae

The family Pandionidae contains only one species, the osprey. The osprey is a medium-large raptor which is a specialist fish-eater with a worldwide distribution.

Osprey, Pandion haliaetus

Hawks, eagles, and kites
Order: AccipitriformesFamily: Accipitridae

Accipitridae is a family of birds of prey, which includes hawks, eagles, kites, harriers and Old World vultures. These birds have powerful hooked beaks for tearing flesh from their prey, strong legs, powerful talons and keen eyesight.

Black-winged kite, Elanus caeruleus (A)
Bearded vulture, Gypaetus barbatus
Oriental honey-buzzard, Pernis ptilorhynchus
Jerdon's baza, Aviceda jerdoni (A)
Black baza, Aviceda leuphotes (A)
Red-headed vulture, Sarcogyps calvus
Cinereous vulture, Aegypius monachus (A)
White-rumped vulture, Gyps bengalensis
Himalayan griffon, Gyps himalayensis
Eurasian griffon, Gyps fulvus (A)
Crested serpent-eagle, Spilornis cheela
Short-toed snake-eagle, Circaetus gallicus (A)
Mountain hawk-eagle, Nisaetus nipalensis
Rufous-bellied eagle, Lophotriorchis kienerii
Black eagle, Ictinaetus malaiensis
Greater spotted eagle, Clanga clanga
Booted eagle, Hieraaetus pennatus
Steppe eagle, Aquila nipalensis
Imperial eagle, Aquila heliaca (A)
Golden eagle, Aquila chrysaetos
Bonelli's eagle, Aquila fasciata
Eurasian marsh-harrier, Circus aeruginosus (A)
Hen harrier, Circus cyaneus
Pied harrier, Circus melanoleucos (A)
Crested goshawk, Accipiter trivirgatus
Shikra, Accipiter badius
Besra, Accipiter virgatus
Eurasian sparrowhawk, Accipiter nisus
Northern goshawk, Accipiter gentilis
Black kite, Milvus migrans
Brahminy kite, Haliastur indus
White-tailed eagle, Haliaeetus albicilla
Pallas's fish-eagle, Haliaeetus leucoryphus
Lesser fish-eagle, Haliaeetus humilis
Common buzzard, Buteo buteo
Himalayan buzzard, Buteo burmanicus
Eastern buzzard, Buteo japonicus (A) 
Long-legged buzzard, Buteo rufinus
Upland buzzard, Buteo hemilasius

Barn-owls
Order: StrigiformesFamily: Tytonidae

Barn-owls are medium to large owls with large heads and characteristic heart-shaped faces. They have long strong legs with powerful talons.

Barn owl, Tyto alba (A)
Oriental bay-owl, Phodilus badius (A)

Owls
Order: StrigiformesFamily: Strigidae

The typical owls are small to large solitary nocturnal birds of prey. They have large forward-facing eyes and ears, a hawk-like beak and a conspicuous circle of feathers around each eye called a facial disk.

Mountain scops-owl, Otus spilocephalus
Collared scops-owl, Otus lettia
Oriental scops-owl, Otus sunia
Eurasian eagle-owl, Bubo bubo (A)
Spot-bellied eagle-owl, Bubo nipalensis
Tawny fish-owl, Ketupa flavipes
Collared owlet, Taenioptynx brodiei
Asian barred owlet, Glaucidium cuculoides
Jungle owlet, Glaucidium radiatum
Spotted owlet, Athene brama
Little owl, Athene noctua (A)
Brown wood-owl, Strix leptogrammica
Tawny owl, Strix aluco
Himalayan owl, Strix nivicolum
Long-eared owl, Asio otus (A)
Short-eared owl, Asio flammeus (A)
Boreal owl, Aegolius funereus (A)
Brown boobook, Ninox scutulata

Trogons
Order: TrogoniformesFamily: Trogonidae

The family Trogonidae includes trogons and quetzals. Found in tropical woodlands worldwide, they feed on insects and fruit, and their broad bills and weak legs reflect their diet and arboreal habits. Although their flight is fast, they are reluctant to fly any distance. Trogons have soft, often colourful, feathers with distinctive male and female plumage. 

Red-headed trogon, Harpactes erythrocephalus
Ward's trogon, Harpactes wardi

Hoopoes
Order: BucerotiformesFamily: Upupidae

Hoopoes have black, white and orangey-pink colouring with a large erectile crest on their head.

Eurasian hoopoe, Upupa epops

Hornbills
Order: BucerotiformesFamily: Bucerotidae

Hornbills are a group of birds whose bill is shaped like a cow's horn, but without a twist, sometimes with a casque on the upper mandible. Frequently, the bill is brightly coloured.

Great hornbill, Buceros bicornis
Oriental pied-hornbill, Anthracoceros albirostris
Rufous-necked hornbill, Aceros nipalensis
Wreathed hornbill, Rhyticeros undulatus

Kingfishers
Order: CoraciiformesFamily: Alcedinidae

Kingfishers are medium-sized birds with large heads, long, pointed bills, short legs and stubby tails.

Blyth's kingfisher, Alcedo hercules
Common kingfisher, Alcedo atthis
Black-backed dwarf-kingfisher, Ceyx erithaca
Stork-billed kingfisher, Pelargopsis capensis
Ruddy kingfisher, Halcyon coromanda
White-throated kingfisher, Halcyon smyrnensis
Black-capped kingfisher, Halcyon pileata (A)
Crested kingfisher, Megaceryle lugubris
Pied kingfisher, Ceryle rudis

Bee-eaters
Order: CoraciiformesFamily: Meropidae

The bee-eaters are a group of near passerine birds in the family Meropidae. Most species are found in Africa but others occur in southern Europe, Madagascar, Australia and New Guinea. They are characterised by richly coloured plumage, slender bodies and usually elongated central tail feathers. All are colourful and have long downturned bills and pointed wings, which give them a swallow-like appearance when seen from afar. 

Blue-bearded bee-eater, Nyctyornis athertoni
Asian green bee-eater, Merops orientalis
Blue-tailed bee-eater, Merops philippinus (A)
Chestnut-headed bee-eater, Merops leschenaulti

Rollers
Order: CoraciiformesFamily: Coraciidae

Rollers resemble crows in size and build, but are more closely related to the kingfishers and bee-eaters. They share the colourful appearance of those groups with blues and browns predominating. The two inner front toes are connected, but the outer toe is not.
Indian roller, Coracias benghalensis
Indochinese roller, Coracias affinis
Dollarbird, Eurystomus orientalis

Asian barbets
Order: PiciformesFamily: Megalaimidae

The Asian barbets are plump birds, with short necks and large heads. They get their name from the bristles which fringe their heavy bills. Most species are brightly coloured.

Coppersmith barbet, Psilopogon haemacephalus
Blue-eared barbet, Psilopogon duvaucelii
Great barbet, Psilopogon virens
Lineated barbet, Psilopogon lineatus
Golden-throated barbet, Psilopogon franklinii
Blue-throated barbet, Psilopogon asiaticus

Honeyguides
Order: PiciformesFamily: Indicatoridae

Honeyguides are among the few birds that feed on wax. They are named for the greater honeyguide which leads traditional honey-hunters to bees' nests and, after the hunters have harvested the honey, feeds on the remaining contents of the hive.

Yellow-rumped honeyguide, Indicator xanthonotus

Woodpeckers
Order: PiciformesFamily: Picidae

Woodpeckers are small to medium-sized birds with chisel-like beaks, short legs, stiff tails and long tongues used for capturing insects. Some species have feet with two toes pointing forward and two backward, while several species have only three toes. Many woodpeckers have the habit of tapping noisily on tree trunks with their beaks.

Eurasian wryneck, Jynx torquilla
Speckled piculet, Picumnus innominatus
White-browed piculet, Sasia ochracea
Brown-capped pygmy woodpecker, Yungipicus nanus (A)
Gray-capped pygmy woodpecker, Yungipicus canicapillus
Rufous-bellied woodpecker, Dendrocopos hyperythrus
Fulvous-breasted woodpecker, Dendrocopos macei
Stripe-breasted woodpecker, Dendrocopos atratus
Darjeeling woodpecker, Dendrocopos darjellensis
Crimson-breasted woodpecker, Dryobates cathpharius
Bay woodpecker, Blythipicus pyrrhotis
Greater flameback, Chrysocolaptes lucidus
Rufous woodpecker, Micropternus brachyurus
Pale-headed woodpecker, Gecinulus grantia
Himalayan flameback, Dinopium shorii
Black-rumped flameback, Dinopium benghalense (A)
Lesser yellownape, Picus chlorolophus
Streak-throated woodpecker, Picus xanthopygaeus
Gray-headed woodpecker, Picus canus
Greater yellownape, Chrysophlegma flavinucha
Great slaty woodpecker, Mulleripicus pulverulentus

Falcons and caracaras
Order: FalconiformesFamily: Falconidae

Falconidae is a family of diurnal birds of prey. They differ from hawks, eagles and kites in that they kill with their beaks instead of their talons. 

Collared falconet, Microhierax caerulescens
Pied falconet, Microhierax melanoleucus
Eurasian kestrel, Falco tinnunculus
Red-necked falcon, Falco chicquera (A)
Amur falcon, Falco amurensis
Merlin, Falco columbarius (A)
Eurasian hobby, Falco subbuteo
Oriental hobby, Falco severus
Peregrine falcon, Falco peregrinus

Old world parrots
Order: PsittaciformesFamily: Psittaculidae

Characteristic features of parrots include a strong curved bill, an upright stance, strong legs, and clawed zygodactyl feet. Many parrots are vividly coloured, and some are multi-coloured. Old World parrots are found from Africa east across south and southeast Asia and Oceania to Australia and New Zealand.

Alexandrine parakeet, Psittacula eupatria
Rose-ringed parakeet, Psittacula krameri (I)
Slaty-headed parakeet, Psittacula himalayana
Gray-headed parakeet, Psittacula finschii (A)
Plum-headed parakeet, Psittacula cyanocephala (A)
Blossom-headed parakeet, Psittacula roseata
Red-breasted parakeet, Psittacula alexandri

Asian and Grauer’s broadbills
Order: PasseriformesFamily: Eurylaimidae

The broadbills are small, brightly coloured birds, which feed on fruit and also take insects in flycatcher fashion, snapping their broad bills. Their habitat is canopies of wet forests.

Long-tailed broadbill, Psarisomus dalhousiae
Silver-breasted broadbill, Serilophus lunatus

Pittas
Order: PasseriformesFamily: Pittidae

Pittas are medium-sized by passerine standards and are stocky, with fairly long, strong legs, short tails and stout bills. Many are brightly coloured. They spend the majority of their time on wet forest floors, eating snails, insects and similar invertebrates.

Blue-naped pitta, Hydrornis nipalensis
Indian pitta, Pitta brachyura (A)
Hooded pitta, Pitta sordida

Cuckooshrikes
Order: PasseriformesFamily: Campephagidae

The cuckooshrikes are small to medium-sized passerine birds. They are predominantly greyish with white and black, although some species are brightly coloured.

Small minivet, Pericrocotus cinnamomeus
Gray-chinned minivet, Pericrocotus solaris
Short-billed minivet, Pericrocotus brevirostris
Long-tailed minivet, Pericrocotus ethologus
Scarlet minivet, Pericrocotus flammeus
Rosy minivet, Pericrocotus roseus
Large cuckooshrike, Coracina macei
Black-winged cuckooshrike, Lalage melaschistos

Vireos, shrike-babblers, and erpornis
Order: PasseriformesFamily: Vireonidae

Most of the members of this family are found in the New World. However, the shrike-babblers and erpornis, which only slightly resemble the "true" vireos and greenlets, are found in South East Asia.

Black-headed shrike-babbler, Pteruthius rufiventer
White-browed shrike-babbler, Pteruthius aeralatus
Green shrike-babbler, Pteruthius xanthochlorus
Black-eared shrike-babbler, Pteruthius melanotis
White-bellied erpornis, Erpornis zantholeuca

Old World orioles
Order: PasseriformesFamily: Oriolidae

The Old World orioles are colourful passerine birds. They are not related to the New World orioles.

Indian golden oriole, Oriolus kundoo
Black-naped oriole, Oriolus chinensis (A)
Slender-billed oriole, Oriolus tenuirostris
Black-hooded oriole, Oriolus xanthornus
Maroon oriole, Oriolus traillii

Woodswallows, bellmagpies, and allies
Order: PasseriformesFamily: Artamidae

The woodswallows are soft-plumaged, somber-coloured passerine birds. They are smooth, agile flyers with moderately large, semi-triangular wings. 

Ashy woodswallow, Artamus fuscus

Vangas, helmetshrikes, and allies
Order: PasseriformesFamily: Vangidae

The family Vangidae is highly variable, though most members of it resemble true shrikes to some degree.

Large woodshrike, Tephrodornis virgatus
Common woodshrike, Tephrodornis pondicerianus
Bar-winged flycatcher-shrike, Hemipus picatus

Ioras
Order: PasseriformesFamily: Aegithinidae

The ioras are bulbul-like birds of open forest or thorn scrub, but whereas that group tends to be drab in colouration, ioras are sexually dimorphic, with the males being brightly plumaged in yellows and greens.

Common iora, Aegithina tiphia

Fantails
Order: PasseriformesFamily: Rhipiduridae

The fantails are small insectivorous birds which are specialist aerial feeders.

White-throated fantail, Rhipidura albicollis

Drongos
Order: PasseriformesFamily: Dicruridae

The drongos are mostly black or dark grey in colour, sometimes with metallic tints. They have long forked tails, and some Asian species have elaborate tail decorations. They have short legs and sit very upright when perched, like a shrike. They flycatch or take prey from the ground.

Black drongo, Dicrurus macrocercus
Ashy drongo, Dicrurus leucophaeus
Crow-billed drongo, Dicrurus annectens
Bronzed drongo, Dicrurus aeneus
Lesser racket-tailed drongo, Dicrurus remifer
Hair-crested drongo, Dicrurus hottentottus
Greater racket-tailed drongo, Dicrurus paradiseus

Monarch flycatchers
Order: PasseriformesFamily: Monarchidae

The monarch flycatchers are small to medium-sized insectivorous passerines which hunt by flycatching. 

Black-naped monarch, Hypothymis azurea
Blyth's paradise-flycatcher, Terpsiphone affinis
Indian paradise-flycatcher, Terpsiphone paradisi

Shrikes
Order: PasseriformesFamily: Laniidae

Shrikes are passerine birds known for their habit of catching other birds and small animals and impaling the uneaten portions of their bodies on thorns. A typical shrike's beak is hooked, like a bird of prey.

Tiger shrike, Lanius tigrinus (A)
Brown shrike, Lanius cristatus
Bay-backed shrike, Lanius vittatus (A)
Long-tailed shrike, Lanius schach
Gray-backed shrike, Lanius tephronotus

Crows, jays, and magpies
Order: PasseriformesFamily: Corvidae

The family Corvidae includes crows, ravens, jays, choughs, magpies, treepies, nutcrackers and ground jays. Corvids are above average in size among the Passeriformes, and some of the larger species show high levels of intelligence.

Eurasian jay, Garrulus glandarius
Yellow-billed blue-magpie, Urocissa flavirostris
Common green-magpie, Cissa chinensis
Rufous treepie, Dendrocitta vagabunda
Gray treepie, Dendrocitta formosae
Collared treepie, Dendrocitta frontalis
Black-rumped magpie, Pica bottanensis
Oriental magpie, Pica serica
Eurasian nutcracker, Nucifraga caryocatactes
Red-billed chough, Pyrrhocorax pyrrhocorax
Yellow-billed chough, Pyrrhocorax graculus
House crow, Corvus splendens
Large-billed crow, Corvus macrorhynchos
Common raven, Corvus corax

Fairy flycatchers
Order: PasseriformesFamily: Stenostiridae

Most of the species of this small family are found in Africa, though a few inhabit tropical Asia. They are not closely related to other birds called "flycatchers".

Yellow-bellied fantail, Chelidorhynx hypoxanthus
Gray-headed canary-flycatcher, Culicicapa ceylonensis

Tits, chickadees, and titmice
Order: PasseriformesFamily: Paridae

The Paridae are mainly small stocky woodland species with short stout bills. Some have crests. They are adaptable birds, with a mixed diet including seeds and insects.

Fire-capped tit, Cephalopyrus flammiceps
Yellow-browed tit, Sylviparus modestus
Sultan tit, Melanochlora sultanea
Coal tit, Periparus ater
Rufous-vented tit, Periparus rubidiventris
Gray-crested tit, Lophophanes dichrous
Green-backed tit, Parus monticolus
Cinereous tit, Parus cinereus
Japanese tit, Parus minor
Yellow-cheeked tit, Parus spilonotus

Larks
Order: PasseriformesFamily: Alaudidae

Larks are small terrestrial birds with often extravagant songs and display flights. Most larks are fairly dull in appearance. Their food is insects and seeds. 

Bengal bushlark, Mirafra assamica
Horned lark, Eremophila alpestris (A) 
Greater short-toed lark, Calandrella brachydactyla (A) 
Hume's lark, Calandrella acutirostris (A) 
Sand lark, Alaudala raytal
Oriental skylark, Alauda gulgula

Cisticolas and allies
Order: PasseriformesFamily: Cisticolidae

The Cisticolidae are warblers found mainly in warmer southern regions of the Old World. They are generally very small birds of drab brown or grey appearance found in open country such as grassland or scrub.

Common tailorbird, Orthotomus sutorius
Himalayan prinia, Prinia crinigera
Black-throated prinia, Prinia atrogularis
Gray-crowned prinia, Prinia cinereocapilla
Rufescent prinia, Prinia rufescens
Gray-breasted prinia, Prinia hodgsonii
Jungle prinia, Prinia sylvatica
Yellow-bellied prinia, Prinia flaviventris
Ashy prinia, Prinia socialis
Plain prinia, Prinia inornata

Reed warblers and allies
Order: PasseriformesFamily: Acrocephalidae

The members of this family are usually rather large for "warblers". Most are rather plain olivaceous brown above with much yellow to beige below. They are usually found in open woodland, reedbeds, or tall grass. The family occurs mostly in southern to western Eurasia and surroundings, but it also ranges far into the Pacific, with some species in Africa.

Thick-billed warbler, Arundinax aedon
Booted warbler, Iduna caligata (A) 
Blyth's reed warbler, Acrocephalus dumetorum
Clamorous reed warbler, Acrocephalus stentoreus

Grassbirds and allies
Order: PasseriformesFamily: Locustellidae

Locustellidae are a family of small insectivorous songbirds found mainly in Eurasia, Africa, and the Australian region. They are smallish birds with tails that are usually long and pointed, and tend to be drab brownish or buffy all over.

Striated grassbird, Megalurus palustris (A) 
Brown bush warbler, Locustella luteoventris
Spotted bush warbler, Locustella thoracica
Russet bush warbler, Locustella mandelli (A)

Cupwings
Order: PasseriformesFamily: Pnoepygidae

The members of this small family are found in mountainous parts of South and South East Asia.

Scaly-breasted cupwing, Pnoepyga albiventer
Pygmy cupwing, Pnoepyga pusilla

Swallows
Order: PasseriformesFamily: Hirundinidae

The family Hirundinidae is adapted to aerial feeding. They have a slender streamlined body, long pointed wings and a short bill with a wide gape. The feet are adapted to perching rather than walking, and the front toes are partially joined at the base.

Gray-throated martin, Riparia chinensis
Bank swallow, Riparia riparia
Pale sand martin, Riparia diluta
Eurasian crag-martin, Ptyonoprogne rupestris
Barn swallow, Hirundo rustica
Red-rumped swallow, Cecropis daurica
Asian house-martin, Delichon dasypus
Nepal house-martin, Delichon nipalensis

Bulbuls
Order: PasseriformesFamily: Pycnonotidae

Bulbuls are medium-sized songbirds. Some are colourful with yellow, red or orange vents, cheeks, throats or supercilia, but most are drab, with uniform olive-brown to black plumage. Some species have distinct crests.

Black-crested bulbul, Rubigula flaviventris
Striated bulbul, Pycnonotus striatus
Red-vented bulbul, Pycnonotus cafer
Red-whiskered bulbul, Pycnonotus jocosus
Himalayan bulbul, Pycnonotus leucogenys
White-throated bulbul, Alophoixus flaveolus
Black bulbul, Hypsipetes leucocephalus
Ashy bulbul, Hemixos flavala
Mountain bulbul, Ixos mcclellandii

Leaf warblers
Order: PasseriformesFamily: Phylloscopidae

Leaf warblers are a family of small insectivorous birds found mostly in Eurasia and ranging into Wallacea and Africa. The species are of various sizes, often green-plumaged above and yellow below, or more subdued with greyish-green to greyish-brown colours.

Ashy-throated warbler, Phylloscopus maculipennis
Buff-barred warbler, Phylloscopus pulcher
Yellow-browed warbler, Phylloscopus inornatus
Hume's warbler, Phylloscopus humei
Lemon-rumped warbler, Phylloscopus proregulus
Tickell's leaf warbler, Phylloscopus affinis
Dusky warbler, Phylloscopus fuscatus
Smoky warbler, Phylloscopus fuligiventer
Common chiffchaff, Phylloscopus collybita (A)
White-spectacled warbler, Phylloscopus affinis
Gray-cheeked warbler, Phylloscopus poliogenys
Green-crowned warbler, Phylloscopus burkii
Whistler's warbler, Phylloscopus whistleri
Greenish warbler, Phylloscopus trochiloides
Large-billed leaf warbler, Phylloscopus magnirostris
Chestnut-crowned warbler, Phylloscopus castaniceps
Yellow-vented warbler, Phylloscopus cantator
Blyth's leaf warbler, Phylloscopus reguloides
Gray-hooded warbler, Phylloscopus xanthoschistos

Bush warblers and allies
Order: PasseriformesFamily: Scotocercidae

The members of this family are found throughout Africa, Asia, and Polynesia. Their taxonomy is in flux, and some authorities place some genera in other families.

Pale-footed bush warbler, Urosphena pallidipes
Gray-bellied tesia, Tesia cyaniventer
Slaty-bellied tesia, Tesia olivea
Chestnut-crowned bush warbler, Cettia major
Gray-sided bush warbler, Cettia brunnifrons
Chestnut-headed tesia, Cettia castaneocoronata
Yellow-bellied warbler, Abroscopus superciliaris
Rufous-faced warbler, Abroscopus albogularis
Black-faced warbler, Abroscopus schisticeps
Mountain tailorbird, Phyllergates cuculatus
Broad-billed warbler, Tickellia hodgsoni
Brown-flanked bush warbler, Horornis fortipes
Hume's bush warbler, Horornis brunnescens
Aberrant bush warbler, Horornis flavolivacea

Long-tailed tits
Order: PasseriformesFamily: Aegithalidae

Long-tailed tits are a group of small passerine birds with medium to long tails. They make woven bag nests in trees. Most eat a mixed diet which includes insects.

Black-throated tit, Aegithalos concinnus
Black-browed tit, Aegithalos iouschistos

Sylviid warblers, parrotbills, and allies
Order: PasseriformesFamily: Sylviidae

The family Sylviidae is a group of small insectivorous passerine birds. They mainly occur as breeding species, as the common name implies, in Europe, Asia and, to a lesser extent, Africa. Most are of generally undistinguished appearance, but many have distinctive songs.

Lesser whitethroat, Curruca curruca
Fire-tailed myzornis, Myzornis pyrrhoura
Golden-breasted fulvetta, Lioparus chrysotis
Jerdon's babbler, Chrysomma altirostre
Brown-throated fulvetta, Fulvetta ludlowi
White-browed fulvetta, Fulvetta vinipectus
Great parrotbill, Conostoma aemodium
Brown parrotbill, Cholornis unicolor
Gray-headed parrotbill, Psittiparus gularis
White-breasted parrotbill, Psittiparus ruficeps
Pale-billed parrotbill, Chleuasicus atrosuperciliaris
Fulvous parrotbill, Suthora fulvifrons
Black-throated parrotbill, Suthora nipalensis

White-eyes, yuhinas, and allies
Order: PasseriformesFamily: Zosteropidae

The white-eyes are small and mostly undistinguished, their plumage above being generally some dull color like greenish-olive, but some species have a white or bright yellow throat, breast or lower parts, and several have buff flanks. As their name suggests, many species have a white ring around each eye.

Striated yuhina, Staphida castaniceps
White-naped yuhina, Yuhina bakeri
Whiskered yuhina, Yuhina flavicollis
Stripe-throated yuhina, Yuhina gularis
Rufous-vented yuhina, Yuhina occipitalis
Black-chinned yuhina, Yuhina nigrimenta
Indian white-eye, Zosterops palpebrosus

Tree-babblers, scimitar-babblers, and allies
Order: PasseriformesFamily: Timaliidae

The babblers, or timaliids, are somewhat diverse in size and colouration, but are characterised by soft fluffy plumage.

Chestnut-capped babbler, Timalia pileata (A)
Pin-striped tit-babbler, Mixornis gularis
Golden babbler, Cyanoderma chrysaeum
Rufous-capped babbler, Cyanoderma ruficeps
Buff-chested babbler, Cyanoderma ambiguum
Rufous-throated wren-babbler, Spelaeornis caudatus
Bar-winged wren-babbler, Spelaeornis troglodytoides
Coral-billed scimitar-babbler, Pomatorhinus ferruginosus
Slender-billed scimitar-babbler, Pomatorhinus superciliaris
Streak-breasted scimitar-babbler, Pomatorhinus ruficollis
White-browed scimitar-babbler, Pomatorhinus schisticeps
Rusty-cheeked scimitar-babbler, Erythrogenys erythrogenys
Spot-breasted scimitar-babbler, Erythrogenys erythrocnemis
Gray-throated babbler, Stachyris nigriceps
Sikkim wedge-billed babbler, Stachyris humei

Ground babblers and allies
Order: PasseriformesFamily: Pellorneidae

These small to medium-sized songbirds have soft fluffy plumage but are otherwise rather diverse. Members of the genus Illadopsis are found in forests, but some other genera are birds of scrublands.

White-hooded babbler, Gampsorhynchus rufulus
Yellow-throated fulvetta, Schoeniparus cinereus
Rufous-winged fulvetta, Schoeniparus castaneceps
Rufous-throated fulvetta, Schoeniparus rufogularis
Rusty-capped fulvetta, Schoeniparus dubius
Puff-throated babbler, Pellorneum ruficeps
Spot-throated babbler, Pellorneum albiventre
Buff-breasted babbler, Pellorneum tickelli (A)
Eyebrowed wren-babbler, Napothera epilepidota
Long-billed wren-babbler, Napothera malacoptila
Abbott's babbler, Malacocincla abbotti
Indian grassbird, Graminicola bengalensis

Laughingthrushes and allies
Order: PasseriformesFamily: Leiothrichidae

The members of this family are diverse in size and colouration, though those of genus Turdoides tend to be brown or greyish. The family is found in Africa, India, and southeast Asia.

Nepal fulvetta, Alcippe nipalensis
Striated laughingthrush, Grammatoptila striata
Himalayan cutia, Cutia nipalensis
Jungle babbler, Argya striata
White-crested laughingthrush, Garrulax leucolophus
Lesser necklaced laughingthrush, Garrulax monileger
Rufous-chinned laughingthrush, Ianthocincla rufogularis
Spotted laughingthrush, Ianthocincla ocellata
Greater necklaced laughingthrush, Pterorhinus pectoralis
White-throated laughingthrush, Pterorhinus albogularis
Rufous-necked laughingthrush, Pterorhinus ruficollis
Rufous-vented laughingthrush, Pterorhinus gularis
Gray-sided laughingthrush, Pterorhinus caerulatus
Bhutan laughingthrush, Trochalopteron imbricatum
Scaly laughingthrush, Trochalopteron subunicolor
Blue-winged laughingthrush, Trochalopteron squamatus
Black-faced laughingthrush, Trochalopteron affinis
Chestnut-crowned laughingthrush, Trochalopteron erythrocephalus
Rufous sibia, Heterophasia capistrata
Beautiful sibia, Heterophasia pulchella (A)
Long-tailed sibia, Heterophasia picaoides
Silver-eared mesia, Leiothrix argentauris
Red-billed leiothrix, Leiothrix lutea
Red-tailed minla, Minla ignotincta
Rufous-backed sibia, Leioptila annectens
Red-faced liocichla, Liocichla phoenicea
Hoary-throated barwing, Actinodura nipalensis
Rusty-fronted barwing, Actinodura egertoni
Blue-winged minla, Actinodura cyanouroptera
Chestnut-tailed minla, Actinodura strigula

Kinglets
Order: PasseriformesFamily: Regulidae

The kinglets, also called crests, are a small group of birds often included in the Old World warblers, but frequently given family status because they also resemble the titmice. 

Goldcrest, Regulus regulus

Wallcreeper
Order: PasseriformesFamily: Tichodromidae

The wallcreeper is a small bird related to the nuthatch family, which has stunning crimson, grey and black plumage.

Wallcreeper, Tichodroma muraria

Nuthatches
Order: PasseriformesFamily: Sittidae

Nuthatches are small woodland birds. They have the unusual ability to climb down trees head first, unlike other birds which can only go upwards. Nuthatches have big heads, short tails and powerful bills and feet. 

Chestnut-bellied nuthatch, Sitta castanea
White-tailed nuthatch, Sitta himalayensis
Velvet-fronted nuthatch, Sitta frontalis
Beautiful nuthatch, Sitta formosa

Treecreepers
Order: PasseriformesFamily: Certhiidae

Treecreepers are small woodland birds, brown above and white below. They have thin pointed down-curved bills, which they use to extricate insects from bark. They have stiff tail feathers, like woodpeckers, which they use to support themselves on vertical trees.

Hodgson's treecreeper, Certhia hodgsoni
Bar-tailed treecreeper, Certhia himalayana (A)
Rusty-flanked treecreeper, Certhia nipalensis
Sikkim treecreeper, Certhia discolor

Wrens
Order: PasseriformesFamily: Troglodytidae

The wrens are mainly small and inconspicuous except for their loud songs. These birds have short wings and thin down-turned bills. Several species often hold their tails upright. All are insectivorous.

Eurasian wren, Troglodytes troglodytes

Spotted elachura
Order: PasseriformesFamily: Elachuridae

This species, the only one in its family, inhabits forest undergrowth throughout South East Asia.

Spotted elachura, Elachura formosa

Dippers
Order: PasseriformesFamily: Cinclidae

Dippers are a group of perching birds whose habitat includes aquatic environments in the Americas, Europe and Asia. They are named for their bobbing or dipping movements.

White-throated dipper, Cinclus cinclus
Brown dipper, Cinclus pallasii

Starlings
Order: PasseriformesFamily: Sturnidae

Starlings are small to medium-sized passerine birds. Their flight is strong and direct and they are very gregarious. Their preferred habitat is fairly open country. They eat insects and fruit. Plumage is typically dark with a metallic sheen.

Golden-crested myna, Ampeliceps coronatus (A)
Common hill myna, Gracula religiosa
European starling, Sturnus vulgaris (A)
Rosy starling, Pastor roseus (A)
Indian pied starling, Gracupica contra
Brahminy starling, Sturnia pagodarum (A)
Chestnut-tailed starling, Sturnia malabarica
White-cheeked starling, Spodiopsar cineraceus (A)
Common myna, Acridotheres tristis
Bank myna, Acridotheres ginginianus
Jungle myna, Acridotheres fuscus
Spot-winged starling, Saroglossa spilopterus

Thrushes and allies
Order: PasseriformesFamily: Turdidae

The thrushes are a group of passerine birds that occur mainly in the Old World. They are plump, soft plumaged, small to medium-sized insectivores or sometimes omnivores, often feeding on the ground. Many have attractive songs.

Grandala, Grandala coelicolor
Long-tailed thrush, Zoothera dixoni
Alpine thrush, Zoothera mollissima
Himalayan thrush, Zoothera salimalii
Long-billed thrush, Zoothera monticola
Scaly thrush, Zoothera dauma
Purple cochoa, Cochoa purpurea
Green cochoa, Cochoa viridis
Pied thrush, Geokichla wardii (A)
Orange-headed thrush, Geokichla citrina
Eurasian blackbird, Turdus merula
Gray-winged blackbird, Turdus boulboul
Indian blackbird, Turdus simillimus
Tickell's thrush, Turdus unicolor
Eyebrowed thrush, Turdus obscurus
White-backed thrush, Turdus kessleri
Tibetan blackbird, Turdus maximus
White-collared blackbird, Turdus albocinctus
Chestnut thrush, Turdus rubrocanus
Black-throated thrush, Turdus atrogularis
Red-throated thrush, Turdus ruficollis
Dusky thrush, Turdus eunomus (A) 
Naumann's thrush, Turdus naumanni (A)

Old World flycatchers
Order: PasseriformesFamily: Muscicapidae

Old World flycatchers are a large group of small passerine birds native to the Old World. They are mainly small arboreal insectivores. The appearance of these birds is highly varied, but they mostly have weak songs and harsh calls.

Dark-sided flycatcher, Muscicapa sibirica
Ferruginous flycatcher, Muscicapa ferruginea
Asian brown flycatcher, Muscicapa dauurica
Brown-breasted flycatcher, Muscicapa muttui (A)
Indian robin, Copsychus fulicatus
Oriental magpie-robin, Copsychus saularis
White-rumped shama, Copsychus malabaricus
White-gorgeted flycatcher, Anthipes monileger
Pale-chinned blue flycatcher, Cyornis poliogenys
Pale blue flycatcher, Cyornis unicolor
Blue-throated flycatcher, Cyornis rubeculoides
Hill blue flycatcher, Cyornis whitei (A)
Large niltava, Niltava grandis
Small niltava, Niltava macgrigoriae
Rufous-bellied niltava, Niltava sundara
Vivid niltava, Niltava vivida (A)
Verditer flycatcher, Eumyias thalassina
Rusty-bellied shortwing, Brachypteryx hyperythra (A)
Gould's shortwing, Brachypteryx stellata
Lesser shortwing, Brachypteryx leucophrys
Himalayan shortwing, Brachypteryx cruralis
Indian blue robin, Larvivora brunnea
White-bellied redstart, Luscinia phaenicuroides
Bluethroat, Luscinia svecica (A)
Blue whistling-thrush, Myophonus caeruleus
Little forktail, Enicurus scouleri
White-crowned forktail, Enicurus leschenaulti
Spotted forktail, Enicurus maculatus
Black-backed forktail, Enicurus immaculatus
Slaty-backed forktail, Enicurus schistaceus
Siberian rubythroat, Calliope calliope
Himalayan rubythroat, Calliope pectoralis
Chinese rubythroat, Calliope tschebaiewi
White-tailed robin, Myiomela leucura
Blue-fronted robin, Cinclidium frontale
Himalayan bluetail, Tarsiger rufilatus
Rufous-breasted bush-robin, Tarsiger hyperythrus
White-browed bush-robin, Tarsiger indicus
Golden bush-robin, Tarsiger chrysaeus
Slaty-backed flycatcher, Ficedula hodgsonii
Slaty-blue flycatcher, Ficedula tricolor
Snowy-browed flycatcher, Ficedula hyperythra
Pygmy flycatcher, Ficedula hodgsoni
Rufous-gorgeted flycatcher, Ficedula strophiata
Sapphire flycatcher, Ficedula sapphira
Little pied flycatcher, Ficedula westermanni
Ultramarine flycatcher, Ficedula superciliaris
Taiga flycatcher, Ficedula albicilla
Kashmir flycatcher, Ficedula subrubra (A)
Red-breasted flycatcher, Ficedula parva
Blue-fronted redstart, Phoenicurus frontalis
Plumbeous redstart, Phoenicurus fuliginosus
White-capped redstart, Phoenicurus leucocephalus
Blue-capped redstart, Phoenicurus caeruleocephalus
Hodgson's redstart, Phoenicurus hodgsoni
White-throated redstart, Phoenicurus schisticeps
White-winged redstart, Phoenicurus erythrogastrus (A)
Black redstart, Phoenicurus ochruros
Daurian redstart, Phoenicurus auroreus
Chestnut-bellied rock-thrush, Monticola rufiventris
Blue-capped rock-thrush, Monticola cinclorhyncha
Blue rock-thrush, Monticola solitarius
White-throated bushchat, Saxicola insignis (A)
Siberian stonechat, Saxicola maurus
Amur stonechat, Saxicola stejnegeri (A)
Pied bushchat, Saxicola caprata
Gray bushchat, Saxicola ferreus
Northern wheatear, Oenanthe oenanthe (A)
Isabelline wheatear, Oenanthe isabellina (A)
Desert wheatear, Oenanthe deserti (A)
Pied wheatear, Oenanthe pleschanka (A)

Flowerpeckers
Order: PasseriformesFamily: Dicaeidae

The flowerpeckers are very small, stout, often brightly coloured birds, with short tails, short thick curved bills and tubular tongues.

Thick-billed flowerpecker, Dicaeum agile
Yellow-vented flowerpecker, Dicaeum chrysorrheum
Yellow-bellied flowerpecker, Dicaeum melanozanthum
Pale-billed flowerpecker, Dicaeum erythrorhynchos
Plain flowerpecker, Dicaeum minullum
Fire-breasted flowerpecker, Dicaeum ignipectus
Scarlet-backed flowerpecker, Dicaeum cruentatum

Sunbirds and spiderhunters
Order: PasseriformesFamily: Nectariniidae

The sunbirds and spiderhunters are very small passerine birds which feed largely on nectar, although they will also take insects, especially when feeding young. Flight is fast and direct on their short wings. Most species can take nectar by hovering like a hummingbird, but usually perch to feed.

Ruby-cheeked sunbird, Chalcoparia singalensis
Purple sunbird, Cinnyris asiaticus
Fire-tailed sunbird, Aethopyga ignicauda
Black-throated sunbird, Aethopyga saturata
Mrs. Gould's sunbird, Aethopyga gouldiae
Green-tailed sunbird, Aethopyga nipalensis
Crimson sunbird, Aethopyga siparaja
Little spiderhunter, Arachnothera longirostra
Streaked spiderhunter, Arachnothera magna

Fairy-bluebirds
Order: PasseriformesFamily: Irenidae

The fairy-bluebirds are bulbul-like birds of open forest or thorn scrub. The males are dark-blue and the females a duller green. 

Asian fairy-bluebird, Irena puella

Leafbirds
Order: PasseriformesFamily: Chloropseidae

The leafbirds are small, bulbul-like birds. The males are brightly plumaged, usually in greens and yellows.

Golden-fronted leafbird, Chloropsis aurifrons
Orange-bellied leafbird, Chloropsis hardwickii

Weavers and allies
Order: PasseriformesFamily: Ploceidae

The weavers are small passerine birds related to the finches. They are seed-eating birds with rounded conical bills. The males of many species are brightly coloured, usually in red or yellow and black, some species show variation in colour only in the breeding season.

Streaked weaver, Ploceus manyar 
Baya weaver, Ploceus philippinus
Finn's weaver, Ploceus megarhynchus
Black-breasted weaver, Ploceus benghalensis

Waxbills and allies
Order: PasseriformesFamily: Estrildidae

The estrildid finches are small passerine birds of the Old World tropics and Australasia. They are gregarious and often colonial seed eaters with short thick but pointed bills. They are all similar in structure and habits, but have wide variation in plumage colours and patterns. 

White-rumped munia, Lonchura striata
Scaly-breasted munia, Lonchura punctulata
Pin-tailed parrotfinch, Erythrura prasina (A)

Accentors
Order: PasseriformesFamily: Prunellidae

The accentors are in the only bird family, Prunellidae, which is completely endemic to the Palearctic. They are small, fairly drab species superficially similar to sparrows. 

Alpine accentor, Prunella collaris
Altai accentor, Prunella himalayana
Robin accentor, Prunella rubeculoides
Rufous-breasted accentor, Prunella strophiata
Brown accentor, Prunella fulvescens (A)
Maroon-backed accentor, Prunella immaculata

Old World sparrows
Order: PasseriformesFamily: Passeridae

Old World sparrows are small passerine birds. In general, sparrows tend to be small, plump, brown or grey birds with short tails and short powerful beaks. Sparrows are seed eaters, but they also consume small insects.

House sparrow, Passer domesticus
Russet sparrow, Passer cinnamomeus
Eurasian tree sparrow, Passer montanus

Wagtails and pipits
Order: PasseriformesFamily: Motacillidae

Motacillidae is a family of small passerine birds with medium to long tails. They include the wagtails, longclaws and pipits. They are slender, ground feeding insectivores of open country.

Forest wagtail, Dendronanthus indicus
Gray wagtail, Motacilla cinerea
Western yellow wagtail, Motacilla flava
Eastern yellow wagtail, Motacilla tschutschensis
Citrine wagtail, Motacilla citreola
White-browed wagtail, Motacilla maderaspatensis
White wagtail, Motacilla alba
Richard's pipit, Anthus richardi
Paddyfield pipit, Anthus rufulus
Long-billed pipit, Anthus similis
Blyth's pipit, Anthus godlewskii
Tawny pipit, Anthus campestris (A) 
Rosy pipit, Anthus roseatus
Tree pipit, Anthus trivialis (A) 
Olive-backed pipit, Anthus hodgsoni
Red-throated pipit, Anthus cervinus (A) 
Water pipit, Anthus spinoletta (A) 
American pipit, Anthus rubescens (A)

Finches, euphonias, and allies
Order: PasseriformesFamily: Fringillidae

Finches are seed-eating passerine birds, that are small to moderately large and have a strong beak, usually conical and in some species very large. All have twelve tail feathers and nine primaries. These birds have a bouncing flight with alternating bouts of flapping and gliding on closed wings, and most sing well. 

Common chaffinch, Fringilla coelebs (A)
Brambling, Fringilla montifringilla (A)
Collared grosbeak, Mycerobas affinis
Spot-winged grosbeak, Mycerobas melanozanthos
White-winged grosbeak, Mycerobas carnipes
Common rosefinch, Carpodacus erythrinus
Scarlet finch, Carpodacus sipahi
Himalayan beautiful rosefinch, Carpodacus pulcherrimus
Dark-rumped rosefinch, Carpodacus edwardsii
Pink-browed rosefinch, Carpodacus rhodochrous
Streaked rosefinch, Carpodacus rubicilloides
Red-fronted rosefinch, Carpodacus puniceus
Crimson-browed finch, Carpodacus subhimachalus
Himalayan white-browed rosefinch, Carpodacus thura
Brown bullfinch, Pyrrhula nipalensis
Red-headed bullfinch, Pyrrhula erythrocephala
Gray-headed bullfinch, Pyrrhula erythaca
Blanford's rosefinch, Agraphospiza rubescens
Golden-naped finch, Pyrrhoplectes epauletta
Spectacled finch, Callacanthis burtoni (A)
Dark-breasted rosefinch, Procarduelis nipalensis
Plain mountain finch, Leucosticte nemoricola
Black-headed mountain finch, Leucosticte brandti
Yellow-breasted greenfinch, Chloris spinoides
Red crossbill, Loxia curvirostra
Tibetan serin, Spinus thibetanus

Longspurs and snow buntings
Order: PasseriformesFamily: Calcariidae

The Calcariidae are a group of passerine birds which had been traditionally grouped with the New World sparrows, but differ in a number of respects and are usually found in open grassy areas.

Lapland longspur, Calcarius lapponicus (A)

Old World buntings
Order: PasseriformesFamily: Emberizidae

The emberizids are a large family of passerine birds. They are seed-eating birds with distinctively shaped bills. Many emberizid species have distinctive head patterns.

Crested bunting, Emberiza lathami
Godlewski's bunting, Emberiza godlewskii (A)
Gray-necked bunting, Emberiza buchanani (A)
Little bunting, Emberiza pusilla
Rustic bunting, Emberiza rustica (A)
Black-faced bunting, Emberiza spodocephala (A)

See also
List of birds
Lists of birds by region

References

Bhutan
Bhutan
 
Birds